The 2022–23 NIFL Irish Premiership (known as the Danske Bank Premiership for sponsorship reasons) is the 15th season of Northern Ireland's highest national football league in this format since its inception in 2008, the 122nd season of the Irish League overall. The 38-game season commenced on 12 August 2022 and is due to conclude on 29 April 2023.

Linfield are the four-time defending champions, having been league winners in the previous four seasons - the 2021–22 season seeing them win a world record 56th league crown.

The winners will enter the 2023–24 UEFA Champions League first qualifying round, while the runners-up will join the Irish Cup winners and the play-off winners in the 2023–24 UEFA Europa Conference League first qualifying round.

Teams

Twelve teams will compete in this season's Premiership, eleven of which return from the previous season. Warrenpoint Town finished bottom of the table the previous season, and were relegated to the NIFL Championship after five years as a Premiership club, with Championship winners Newry City promoted to replace them for this season's Premiership. 11th-placed Portadown retained their Premiership status after defeating Annagh United 4–2 on aggregate in the Premiership play-off.

Stadia and locations

League table

Results

Matches 1–22
During matches 1–22 each team plays every other team twice (home and away).

Matches 23–33
During matches 23–33 each team plays every other team for the third time (either at home or away).

Matches 34–38
For the final five matches, the table splits into two halves, with the top six teams forming Section A and the bottom six teams forming Section B. Each team plays every other team in their respective section once. The fixtures are reversed from those played during rounds 23–33, ensuring that teams have played every other team in their respective section twice at home and twice away overall throughout the season.

Section A

Section B

Play-offs

UEFA Europa Conference League play-offs
Four or five of the clubs that finish in 3rd–7th place will compete for one place in the 2023–24 Europa Conference League first qualifying round. The play-offs are one-off matches with extra time and penalties used to determine the winner if necessary, with the higher-ranked teams given home advantage against the lower-ranked teams (i.e. 3rd v. 7th and 5th v. 6th) in the semi-finals. The higher-ranked of the two semi-final winners will also have home advantage in the final.

NIFL Premiership play-off
The eleventh-placed club will face the second-placed club from the 2022–23 NIFL Championship for one place in the following season's Premiership.

References

External links

NIFL Premiership seasons
Northern Ireland
2022–23 in Northern Ireland association football